The 2016–17 NC State Wolfpack women's basketball team represents North Carolina State University during the 2016–17 NCAA Division I women's basketball season. The Wolfpack, led by fourth-year head coach Wes Moore, return to play their home games at Reynolds Coliseum after a one year of renovation and were members of the Atlantic Coast Conference. They finished the season 23–9, 12–4 in ACC play to finish in a tie for fourth place. They lost in the quarterfinals of the ACC women's tournament  to Louisville. They received at-large bid of the NCAA women's tournament where they defeated Auburn in the first round before losing to Texas in the second round.

Roster

Media
WKNC acts as the home for Wolfpack women's basketball. Patrick Kinas and Rachel Stockdale provide the call for the games. ESPN and the ACC RSN will televise select Wolfpack games during the season. All non-televised home conference games will be shown on ESPN3 using the radio broadcasters for the call.

Schedule

|-
!colspan=9 style="background:#E00000; color:white;"| Exhibition

|-
!colspan=9 style="background:#E00000; color:white;"| Non-conference regular season

|-
!colspan=9 style="background:#E00000; color:white;"| ACC regular season

|-
!colspan=9 style="background:#E00000; color:white;"| ACC Women's tournament

|-
!colspan=9 style="background:#E00000; color:white;"| NCAA Women's tournament

Source

Rankings

References

NC State Wolfpack women's basketball seasons
NC State
North Carolina State